Artem Kostyantynovych Shulyanskyi (born 11 April 2001) is a Ukrainian professional footballer who plays as a left winger for Ukrainian Premier League club Oleksandriya.

References

External links
 
 

2001 births
Living people
Footballers from Kyiv
Ukrainian footballers
Ukraine youth international footballers
Association football forwards
FC Dynamo Kyiv players
FC Oleksandriya players
Ukrainian Premier League players